The Skoda 75 mm Model 1936 (75 mm M.36) was a mountain gun manufactured by Skoda Works, in  Czechoslovakia, and a variant was produced in Soviet Union (as the 76 mm mountain gun M1938). Skoda also produced a handful of the 76.2 mm variant. For transport, the gun could be broken down into 3 sections, and further broken down into ten loads. The gun crew was protected by an armoured shield.

References

Mountain artillery
Artillery of Czechoslovakia
75 mm artillery
Military equipment introduced in the 1930s